La historia de Bienvenido ("Bienvenido's Story") is a 1964 Spanish children's movie. It stars Marisol.

Synopsys 
Famous young star Marisol comes to a children's hospital to entertain the children and tells them a story about the life of a little donkey named Bienvenido who was separated from his mother, left to look for her and went through many difficulties and hardships.

Songs 
 Bienvenido (music by Antonio Moya, lyrics by Sánchez Silva) sung by Marisol

Cast 
 Marisol
 Boliche (Manuel Bermúdez)
 Jesús Guzmán
 Anabel Pintado
 Mari Carmen
 Augusto
 Valentín Tornos
 Miguel Armario
 Antonio Braña
 José María Labernié
 Milagros Guijarro

References

External links 
 

1960s Spanish-language films
1964 in Spain
1964 films

Spanish children's films
1960s Spanish films